Kasur Junction railway station (Urdu and ) is  located in  Pakistan. Kasur Junction was a junction before the partition of India and Pakistan. But after partition it became only a railway station.  From here, a branch line used to go to Amritsar junction via Ferozepur, now after the division of this line is dead end. In today's time there is only one train arrival and departure.

See also
 List of railway stations in Pakistan
 Pakistan Railways

References

External links

Railway stations in Kasur District
Railway stations on Lodhran–Raiwind Line